The Glatt Valley (German: Glattal or Glatttal) is a region and a river valley in the canton of Zürich in Switzerland.

Geography 
The Glatt is a tributary to the Rhine in the Zürcher Unterland area of the canton of Zurich.

The Region Glatttal comprises, among other communities in the districts of Uster, Dielsdorf and Bülach, the suburban cities and municipalities of Bassersdorf, Bülach, Dietlikon, Dübendorf, Fällanden, Glattfelden, Höri, Kloten, Oberglatt, Opfikon-Glattbrugg, Rümlang, Schwerzenbach, Wallisellen and Wangen-Brüttisellen. In addition, the districts 11 and 12 (so-called Zürich-Nord) of the city of Zürich, consisting of the districts of Affoltern, Oerlikon and Seebach respectively Hirzenbach, Saatlen and Schwamendingen Mitte, are geographically located in the Glattal.

Economics and transport 
Thanks to its excellent location including infrastructure, a growing economy and attractive residential areas, the Glattal is densely populated. Hosting the most important airport between Milan and Munich increases both the attractiveness and the noise for residents. 
One of the biggest Glattal building projects for mostly residential space of the last decade has been Glattpark. In Zürich Oerlikon, Seebach and Affoltern, the urban residential neighbourhood Neu-Oerlikon was built. The society glow Glattal, operated by the municipalities, is intended to enhance networking of the region and to common projects.

The Glatt Valley has excellent transport links: Zurich Airport in Kloten, SBB-CFF-FFS (InterRegio and InterCity) lines serving Zurich Oerlikon and Zurich Airport railway stations which are among the 15 most frequented railway stations in Switzerland, additionally to commuter railway lines S2, S3, S5, S6, S7, S8, S9, S14, S15 and S16. The tramway lines of Stadtbahn Glattal are a rapid-transit system integrated with the tramway system of the city of Zurich. Verkehrsbetriebe Zürich (VBZ) and Verkehrsbetriebe Glattal (VBG) provide additional bus services.

References

External links

 Agglomerationslandschaften: Das Glattal 
 

Regions of Switzerland
River valleys of Switzerland
High Rhine basin
Landforms of the canton of Zürich